The Indian cricket team toured Sri Lanka from 25 August to 22 September 1985. The tour consisted of three Test matches and three One Day Internationals (ODIs). Sri Lanka won the second Test of the series.

Test Series

1st Test

2nd Test

3rd Test

One Day Internationals (ODIs)

1st ODI

2nd ODI

3rd ODI

References

1985 in Indian cricket
1985 in Sri Lankan cricket
1985
International cricket competitions from 1980–81 to 1985
Sri Lankan cricket seasons from 1972–73 to 1999–2000